Hamtaro, known in Japan as , is a Japanese manga and storybook series created and illustrated by Ritsuko Kawai about a hamster. The manga was serialized in Shogakukan's "Second Grade" magazine in April 1997; more Hamtaro stories would later be added into the other grade-level magazines, as well as in Ciao. The series focuses on a hamster named Hamtaro, who has a variety of adventures with other hamsters known as the "Ham-Hams" ("Hamuchans" in the Japanese version). Viz Media published the manga adaptations and storybooks in English.

Multiple anime adaptations were produced by TMS Entertainment and aired on TV Tokyo. The first series was dubbed in English by The Ocean Group.

Plot 

The series revolves around a hamster named Hamtaro, who is owned by a 10-year-old girl named Laura Haruna (Hiroko Haruna in the Japanese/Original version). Curious by nature, he ventures out each day to make friends and go on adventures with a clan of fellow hamster friends known as The Ham-Hams. The Ham-Hams meet at a special clubhouse built by Boss ("Taisho").

Media

Manga 
There are three manga about Hamtaro, A Home for Hamtaro, Hamtaro Gets Lost, and Jealous Hamtaro. In the first two, Hamtaro's owner is named Yukari while in the latter, her name is Amy.

Anime 

In Japan, Hamtaro aired three anime series, released four films, several specials, many video game/DVD releases and merchandise. By 2002, the franchise had generated $2.5 billion in merchandise sales. The success was not paralleled in the United States, however, with only the first series, some special episodes, three video games (though two others were released in Europe), and limited merchandise. On 23 February 2011, it was announced that Hamtaro would be receiving a series titled Trotting Hamtaro Dechu!.

Games 

The Hamtaro franchise has multiple video game titles with independent storylines. These titles include adventure and educational games that can be found for PC, Game Boy Color, Game Boy Advance (GBA), and the Nintendo DS consoles.

In popular culture 
On 26 July 2020, a group of more than 2,000 protesters in Bangkok called the Free Youth Movement, led a protest against the government of Thailand which involved singing the theme song for Hamtaro with modified lyrics to say "The most delicious food is taxpayers’ money. [...]Dissolve the parliament! Dissolve the parliament! Dissolve the parliament!" Other student protests during the same week have continued using Hamtaro as a symbol for the government's "feasting on taxpayer's money," and have involved groups running in circles, as if in hamster wheels, while singing the modified version of the jingle.

References

External links 

 Hamtaro Official Japanese site 
 
 

 
2000 Japanese television series debuts
2006 Japanese television series endings
2000s fads and trends
Animated television series about mammals
Fictional hamsters
Shogakukan franchises
Shogakukan manga
Shōjo manga
Toonami
TMS Entertainment
TV Tokyo original programming
Viz Media anime